Ji Xiaojing (born 18 June 1988) is a Chinese female sport shooter. She mainly competes in ISSF 10m air pistol event at international shooting competitions. She represented China at the 2018 Asian Games and claimed her first Asian Games medal, gold in the AP60 mixed team event along with Wu Jiayu.

Career
She started training the sport of shooting in 2002 at the age of 14. She rose to prominence in international level after claiming a gold medal in the women's 10m air pistol event and clinching a silver medal in the women's 25m pistol event during the 2013 Asian Air Gun Championships.

Ji Xiaojing also claimed victorious at the 2018 ISSF World Cup by securing a gold in the 10m air pistol mixed team event with Wu Jiayu. She also clinched a silver medal in the women's 10 m air pistol event at the 2018 ISSF World Cup.

She qualified to compete at the 2018 Asian Games, her maiden Asian Games appearance and took gold medal in the mixed team category.

Records

References

External links

1988 births
Living people
Chinese female sport shooters
Shooters at the 2018 Asian Games
Medalists at the 2018 Asian Games
Asian Games gold medalists for China
Asian Games medalists in shooting
Sport shooters from Liaoning
ISSF pistol shooters